Masoud Nosrati is an Iranian politician and the Deputy Resources and Support of Organization of municipalities and government agencies Development.

He was elected as Sixty-Fifth mayor of Rasht by the Islamic City Council of Rasht on September 4, 2017. He resigned from this position on July 24, 2018 

President of the World Assembly of Silk Road Cities WASRC
President of the World Assembly of Islamic Cities WAIC
Education: Ph.D. urbanization - the tendency of Geography and Urban Planning
Master of Public Administration (Graduate Institute of Research Management and Planning, 2003)
Civil engineer Islamic Azad University of Maragheh 
Mayor of Qazvin
Mayor of Rasht

References

Living people
1968 births
Mayors of places in Iran